Zhang Xiang (born 10 August 2000) is a Chinese footballer currently playing as a defender for Jiangxi Beidamen.

Career statistics

Club
.

References

2000 births
Living people
Chinese footballers
Association football defenders
Chinese Super League players
Chongqing Liangjiang Athletic F.C. players